Baraghida is a village in northern Aleppo Governorate, northwestern Syria. Nearby localities include   to the west, Dudiyan  to the east and Sawran  to the south.

Demographics
In the 2004 census, Baraghida had a population of 995. In late 19th century, traveler Martin Hartmann noted Baraghida as a Turkish village of 10 houses, then located in the Ottoman nahiyah of Azaz-i Turkman.

References

Populated places in Azaz District
Turkmen communities in Syria